The BAC 167 Strikemaster is a British jet-powered training and light attack aircraft. It was a development of the Hunting Jet Provost trainer, itself a jet engined version of the Percival Provost, which originally flew in 1950 with a radial piston engine.

Design and development
The BAC 167 Strikemaster is essentially an armed version of the Jet Provost T Mk 5; the Strikemaster was modified with an uprated engine, wing hardpoints capable of carrying four 500 pound Mk82 bombs, two machine guns under the intakes, uprated flap system with two jacks, larger airbrake jacks, new communication and navigation gear, different electrical system, canopy breakers on the ejection seats, and a revised fuel system including tip tanks on the wing tips. First flown in 1967, the aircraft was marketed as a light attack or counter-insurgency aircraft, but most large-scale purchasers were air forces wanting an advanced trainer, although Ecuador, Oman and Yemen have used their aircraft in combat. A total of 146 were built.

Operational history

The Strikemaster was capable of operating from rough air strips, with dual ejection seats suitable even for low-altitude escape, and it was therefore widely used by third-world nations. Operations by the type were restricted by most military users after the Royal New Zealand Air Force found fatigue cracking in the wings of its aircraft. Many aircraft retired by Botswana, New Zealand, Saudi Arabia and Singapore are in museums and private collections.

The Strikemaster was deployed by the Royal Air Force of Oman on several occasions during the Dhofar Rebellion, including a notable appearance providing Close Air Support during the Battle of Mirbat. Three Strikemasters were shot down over the course of the war, including one lost to an SA-7 missile.

The Ecuadorian Air Force deployed the Strikemaster during the brief 1995 Cenepa War, flying ground sorties against Peruvian positions.  An Ecuadorian Strikemaster crashed during a training mission in the Northern Border area, near Colombia, on 25 March 2009.  Both pilots ejected; one later died of injuries received during the rescue attempt.

Variants

Strikemaster Mk 80 : Export version for Saudi Arabia, 25 aircraft.
Strikemaster Mk 80A: 20 aircraft were sold to Saudi Arabia as part of a follow-up order.
Strikemaster Mk 81 : Export version for South Yemen, four aircraft.
Strikemaster Mk 82 : Export version for Oman, 12 aircraft.
Strikemaster Mk 82A: 12 aircraft were sold to Oman as part of a follow-up order.
Strikemaster Mk 83 : Export version for Kuwait, 12 aircraft.
Strikemaster Mk 84 : Export version for Singapore, 16 aircraft.
Strikemaster Mk 87 : Export version for Kenya, six aircraft.
Strikemaster Mk 88 : Export version for New Zealand, 16 aircraft.
Strikemaster Mk 89 : Export version for Ecuador, 22 aircraft.
Strikemaster Mk 89A: A number of aircraft were sold to Ecuador as part of a follow-up order.
Strikemaster Mk 90 : Export version for Sudan. The last Strikemaster was delivered to Sudan in 1984.

Production
Strikemaster 80: 136
Strikemaster 90: 10

Operators

Botswana Defence Force Air Wing operated briefly ex-Kuwaiti Mk 83s and ex-Kenyan Mk 87s.(later sold to Ivory Coast)

Ecuadorian Air Force received BAC Strikemaster Mk 89/89A aircraft.
 
 Ivorian Air Force purchased two ex-Botswana Strikemasters. One was destroyed during the 2004 French–Ivorian clashes.

Kenya Air Force received BAC Strikemaster Mk 87 aircraft.

Kuwait Air Force received BAC Strikemaster Mk 83 aircraft.

Royal New Zealand Air Force
No. 14 Squadron RNZAF received 16 BAC Strikemaster Mk 88 aircraft.
 Strikemaster Ltd operates two ex-RNZAF BAC Strikemaster Mk 88 aircraft.

Royal Air Force of Oman received BAC Strikemaster Mk 82/82A aircraft.

Royal Saudi Air Force received BAC Strikemaster Mk 80/80A aircraft.

Republic of Singapore Air Force received BAC Strikemaster Mk 84 aircraft, all retired in 1984.

People's Democratic Republic of Yemen Air Force received four BAC Strikemaster Mk 81s in 1970.

Sudanese Air Force received four BAC Strikemaster Mk 90s in 1983.

Specifications (Strikemaster Mk 88)

See also

References
Notes

Bibliography

 Taylor, John W.R. "Hunting Jet Provost and BAC 167." Combat Aircraft of the World from 1909 to the present. New York: G.P. Putnam's Sons, 1969. .
 Taylor, John W. R. Jane's All The World's Aircraft 1976–77. London: Jane's Yearbooks, 1976. .

External links

RNZAF Museum Strikemaster page
ABC Australia News
BAC 167 Strikemaster
Blue Air Training LLC
Strikemaster Ltd

Strikemaster
1960s British attack aircraft
Counterinsurgency
Single-engined jet aircraft
Low-wing aircraft
Aircraft first flown in 1967